Elfriede Moser-Rath (3 February 1926 in Vienna, Austria - 1993 in Unterhaching, Germany) was an Austrian ethnologist specializing in folk tales (folklorist), and early modern literature.  

Moser-Rath received her doctorate in 1949 from the University of Vienna with the publication of her thesis: Studien zur Quellenkunde und Motivik obersteirischer Volksmärchen aus der Sammlung Pramberger, which was an analysis of the narratives in Irish fairytales. She took her first job at the Austrian Folkculture Museum (Österreichischen Museum für Volkskunde).

In 1955 she married Hans Moser, who was the Director of the Bavarian Folk Museum (Bayerischen Landesstelle für Volkskunde) in Munich, but who was also an Austrian native.  In 1969 she went to the University of Göttingen as an assistant professor to work under Professor Rolf Wilhelm Brednich on the Encyclopedia of Fairy Tales (Enzyklopädie des Märchens).  In 1982 she became a full professor there.

She is known primarily for the quality of her work on the Encyclopedia of Fairytales, and her analysis of  literature from early modern times, and especially of Catholic sermons from the baroque period.

Works (selection)
Predigtmärlein der Barockzeit. Exempel, Sage, Schwank und Fabel in geistlichen Quellen des oberdeutschen Raumes. Hrsg von Elfriede Moser-Rath. Berlin 1964.
Die Fabel als rhetorisches Element in der katholischen Predigt der Barockzeit.  pp. 59–75 in: Hasubek, Peter (ed.); Die Fabel: Theorie, Geschichte und Rezeption einer Gattung. Berlin: Schmidt; 1982. 291 pp.
"Lustige Gesellschaft" : Schwank und Witz des 17. u. 18. Jahrhundert in kultur- u. sozialgeschichtlichem Kontext. Stuttgart 1984 
Dem Kirchenvolk die Leviten gelesen : Alltag im Spiegel süddeutscher Barockpredigten. Stuttgart 1991 
Kleine Schriften zur populären Literatur des Barock. Hrsg. von Ulrich Marzolph u.a. Göttingen 1994

References 
Rolf Wilhelm Brednich, Zum 65. Geburtstag von Elfriede Moser-Rath, in: Fabula, 32 (1991), p. 1-3
Rudolf Schenda in: Bayerisches Jahrbuch für Volkskunde 1991, p. 147-149.
Ingrid Tomkowiak: Elfriede Moser-Rath (1926–1993). In: Fabula 35 (1994), p. 125-127
Ingrid Tomkowiak: Moser-Rath, Elfriede. In: Enzyklopädie des Märchens Vol. 9.2. (1998), p. 939-943.
Wolfgang Brückner: Martins von Cochem 'Außerlesenes History-Buch' und seine Vorbilder. Für Elfriede Moser-Rath  in Fabula, 33(3-4) (1992), p. 193-205.

See also
Bengt Holbek
Brothers Grimm
Comparative mythology
Ethnology
Folkloristics
Mythography

1926 births
1993 deaths
Austrian folklorists
Writers from Vienna
Academic staff of the University of Göttingen
Austrian ethnologists